Tessa Earl is a ballet dancer who has performed as company dancer for many Christian dance companies including Ballet Rejoice and the United States' most well-known Christian dance company, Ballet Magnificat!.

Earl founded the  dance studio The Conservatory of Dance in Rocklin, California, which is the official dance studio for the Placer Theatre Ballet. She sold the studio after her marriage
in 2007.

Dance companies
 Placer Theatre Ballet
 Ballet Rejoice
 Ballet Magnificat!
 Marin Dance Theatre
 Sacramento Ballet

References

American ballerinas
Year of birth missing (living people)
Living people
21st-century American women